Anaulacaspis is a genus of beetles belonging to the family Staphylinidae.

The species of this genus are found in Europe, Africa and Northern America.

Species:
 Anaulacaspis adnexa (Fauvel, 1907) 
 Anaulacaspis africana (Cameron, 1947)

References

Staphylinidae
Staphylinidae genera